Idia calvaria is a species of litter moth of the family Erebidae. It is found in Central France and northern and central Central Europe, but mostly in the surroundings of the Mediterranean Sea. It is also present in Turkey, the Caucasus and Anatolia.

The wingspan is 24–34 mm. Adults are on wing from June to September. There are two generations in the south.

The larvae feed on Populus, Salix and Rumex species.

External links

Fauna Europaea
www.nic.funet.fi 
www.lepiforum.de
www.schmetterlinge-deutschlands.de 

Herminiinae
Moths of Europe
Moths of Asia
Taxa named by Michael Denis
Taxa named by Ignaz Schiffermüller
Moths described in 1775